The Avro 519 was a British bomber aircraft of the First World War, a development of the Avro 510 seaplane. They were two-bay biplanes of conventional configuration with greatly uneven span. Two single-seat examples, powered by a single 150 hp (110 kW) Sunbeam water-cooled engine, were ordered by the RNAS in early 1916. This was soon followed by orders for two modified aircraft for the Royal Flying Corps. These were fitted with seats for a crew of two and had more powerful (225 hp/168 kW) Sunbeam engines

The first of the two-seaters was designated 519A to reflect its modifications. The second two-seater, however, was so different that it received a completely new number from Avro - 522 - and featured new wings with both upper and lower wings of equal but greater span, in the hope that this would rectify the type's poor climbing performance.

Never used operationally, all four were used for flight testing with the last still in service in April 1917.

There are some indications that the Avro 522A formed part of the equipment of 2 Squadron, Royal Canadian Air Force in the 1920s.

Specifications (519)

See also

References

External links
 Avro 519 – British Aircraft Directory

1910s British bomber aircraft
519
Single-engined tractor aircraft
Sesquiplanes
Aircraft first flown in 1916
Biplanes